Lester Cecil "Charlie" Nicholls (11 September 1899 – 20 November 1944) was an Australian rules footballer who played with South Melbourne in the Victorian Football League (VFL).

Notes

References
 
 Footballer Divorced: Wife Says He Did Not Like Work, The Herald, (Friday, 26 April 1929), p.3.

External links 

1899 births
1944 deaths
Australian rules footballers from Victoria (Australia)
Australian Rules footballers: place kick exponents
Sydney Swans players